Landess is an unincorporated community and census-designated place (CDP) in Washington and Van Buren townships, Grant County, Indiana, in the United States. As of the 2010 census it had a population of 188.

History
Landess was founded in 1882 by William Landess. A post office was established at Landess in 1884, and remained in operation until it was discontinued in 1996.

Geography
Interstate 69 forms the southeastern edge of the Landess CDP, but there is no access to the highway at this point. The closest interchanges are Exit 264 (Indiana State Road 18),  to the south, and Exit 273 (State Road 5),  to the northeast.

Demographics

References

Census-designated places in Grant County, Indiana
Census-designated places in Indiana